Christopher Wybrow (born 21 August 1961) is an Australian water polo player who competed in the 1984 Summer Olympics, in the 1988 Summer Olympics, and in the 1992 Summer Olympics. In 2011, he was inducted into the Water Polo Australia Hall of Fame.

See also
 Australia men's Olympic water polo team records and statistics
 List of men's Olympic water polo tournament top goalscorers

References

External links
 

1961 births
Living people
Australian male water polo players
Olympic water polo players of Australia
Water polo players at the 1984 Summer Olympics
Water polo players at the 1988 Summer Olympics
Water polo players at the 1992 Summer Olympics